Chittar is a village in Pathanamthitta district, located in Kerala state, India. It is a Panchayat and is situated in the Konni Thaluk and in Konni constituency in Pathanamthitta District. Nearest Railway Station Is Thiruvalla,Located At A Distance Of 53 km.It is located 29 km away from Pathanamthitta town at its east. Nearby Panchayats are Seethathodu, Perunad, Vadaserikkara and Thannithodu. Chittar was formerly represented in the Ranni legislative assembly, but now in Konni assembly. Its previous parliament constituency was Idukki. Chittar was given the Nirmal Gram award from former president Pratibha Patil.

Economy
Chittar is predominantly a plantation township. Earlier famed for tea and coffee, nowadays swaying rubber trees have replaced them, fuelled by the fertile land and rich ecosystem. In addition to rubber cultivation, pineapple, tapioca, nuts, ginger, and pepper are cultivated. It was once a part of the demolished Nilakkal trade centre.

Location
Chittar lies in the eastern part of Pathanamthitta district and bordered by Perunad panchayath in north, Thannithodu in south, Vadasserikkara in west and Seethathodu in east.Located 53 km Away From NH183,In Thiruvalla City.

Administration
The panchayath of Chittar was formed on 30 September 1970 by partitioning the Vadaseerikkara and Seethathodu panchayaths in Ranni taluk. For administrative convenience, the panchayath is divided into 13 wards.

Pambini
Panniyar
Manakkayam
Chittar
Chittar thottam
Meenkuzhi
Kulangaravali
Vayyattupuzha
Manpilavu
Neelipilavu
kattachira
Chittar thekkekkara
Kodumudi

Education

Chittar has one Government High School, two higher secondary education facilities, in addition to several middle schools and lower primary schools. Chittar also has a college.

Important schools:

Govt. L.P.S. Chittar Estate
L.P.School Neeliplavu,
Holy Family Public School,
Govt. H. S. S., Chittar,
Govt. Model L. P. S., Chittar,
V. K. N. M. V. H. S. S, Vayyattupuzha
Komala Vilasm School, Padayanippara
Little Angels English Medium High School karikayam
Royal Parallel College, Chittar
Santhinikethan  College Chittar.

Nearby Colleges:
SNDP  Arts College, Ettichuvadu - Meenkuzhi, chittar
Caarmel Engineering College, R-Perunad
Ideal Parallel College, Chittar
Musalliar Engineering College, *Malayalappuzha
Mount Zion Engineering College, Kadammanitta
Pushpagiri Medical College, Tiruvalla
Muthoot Nursing College, Pathanamthitta
St. Thomas College, Ranni,
Catholicate College, Pathanamthitta
Mar Ivanios ITC, Seethathodu

Population
The people of Chittar are mainly agriculturists and plantation workers. People began settling down in Chittar about 75 years ago. The people mainly belong to Hindu, Christian and Muslim religions. There are several places of religious worship in Chittar. In many of the families based in Chittar, there are large numbers of people working outside Kerala as well as outside India. The new generation is highly educated and well placed in different parts of the world.includes merchant navy engineers,doctors,civil engineers and well known scientists. K.C. Raghunatha Pillai is the vehicle director for the Chandrayaan-2 mission, Sreejith bhadran, merchant navy engineer officer at shipping corporation of India are few examples

 India census, Chittar had a population of 33977 with 16498 males and 17479 females.

See also

 Angamoozhy
 Plappally
 Ranni
 Vayyattupuzha
 Vadaserikara
 Maniyar
 Nilakkal
 Konni

References

Villages in Pathanamthitta district

ml:ചിറ്റാർ ഗ്രാമപഞ്ചായത്ത്